This is an alphabetical list of shopping centres in San Marino:

 Atlante Shopping Center, via Tre Settembre, Dogana (about 40 shops)
 Azzurro Shopping Center, via Marino Moretti, Serravalle - San Marino's biggest shopping center (Conad + 40 shops)
 The Market San Marino Outlet Experience, via Fondo Ausa, Falciano - San Marino's biggest factory outlet (about 130 shops) OPENING 2020 
 Electronics Shopping Center, via Marino Moretti, Serravalle (Dpiù + 5 shops)
 San Marino Centro Commerciale, via del Passetto, Fiorentino (Coal + 10 shops)

Economy of San Marino
San Marino
San Marino-related lists